Sineb El Masrar (born 1981) is a Moroccan-German author, journalist, and Islamic feminist.

She is the founder of the intercultural women's magazine Gazelle and has published several works dealing with the issue of feminism in Islam.

Early life 
Sineb El Masrar was born in 1981 in Hanover, Germany, and grew up there. Her father was a Moroccan car mechanic who left Tangier for Germany in the mid-1960s, and her mother joined him there in the late 1970s.

She first studied business, then graduated with a degree in education. She experienced discrimination during her job search, as the Catholic schools refused to hire a Muslim.

Career 
In June 2006, El Masrar founded Gazelle, a multicultural women's magazine, which she runs as editor in chief.

She became involved in German government projects on integration, serving as a member of the "Media and Integration" working group as part of a conference organized by Minister of State for Migration, Refugees, and Integration Maria Böhmer.

El Masrar's first book, Muslim Girls: Wer Wir Sind, Wie Wir Leben ("Muslim Girls: Who We Are, How We Live"), was published in 2010. It was rereleased in a pocket format in 2015.

Her next book, Emanzipation im Islam ("Emancipation in Islam"), made headlines when it was published in early 2016. It was the subject of a complaint from the Islamist movement Millî Görüş, which compelled El Masrar to withdraw a passage from the book via a ruling of the Munich district court.

In 2018, she published Muslim Men: Wer Sie Sind, Was Sie Wollen ("Muslim Men: Who They Are, What They Want"), in which she discusses prejudice against Muslim men.

El Masrar lives in Berlin.

Political positions 
El Masrar calls for an open and critical interpretation of Islam, and she believes that Islam is not incompatible with women's rights. She emphasizes that Islam as a whole should not be confused with Salafism and points to the existence of female imams and an openly gay imam, Ludovic-Mohamed Zahed, in Marseille, France.

Selected works 

 Muslim Girls: Wer Wir Sind, Wie Wir Leben (2010)
 Emanzipation im Islam (2016)
 Muslim Men: Wer Sie Sind, Was Sie Wollen (2018)

External links 

 Gazelle magazine (in German)

References 

German women writers
German women journalists
German feminists
Moroccan women writers
Moroccan feminists
Muslim writers
Islamic feminism
People from Hanover
Living people
1981 births